Robert Woodworth (June 13, 1743 – after 1806) was a captain in the American Revolution and member of the Woodworth political family.

Life
Woodworth was born in Norwich, Connecticut Colony on June 13, 1743, the son of Daniel Woodworth and Sarah Collins. He eventually moved to Rensselaer Manor, now Greenbush, New York, although maintaining ownership of land in Salisbury, Connecticut, and married Rachel Fitch, daughter of Abel Fitch.

In 1778, he served in the American Revolution as a captain of the Fourth Regiment, Second Rennslaerwyck Battalion. He was elected as a state senator in 1792, serving through 1796. Following that he served as a judge of the Court of Common Pleas, before returning to Albany as a representative of Rennselaer County in 1806, serving a term.

Robert and Rachel were the parents of future New York Attorney General, John Woodworth.

References

1743 births
Year of death missing
Members of the New York State Assembly
Robert
People of colonial Connecticut
Politicians from Norwich, Connecticut
Continental Army officers from Connecticut
Military personnel from Norwich, Connecticut